Alcis jubata, the dotted carpet, is a moth of the family Geometridae. The species was first described by Carl Peter Thunberg in 1788. It is found in central Europe, Scandinavia and northern Italy.

The wingspan is 28–33 mm. The forewings of males and females are whitish to whitish grey or green-grey ground colour. The interior and exterior crosslines are wavy, often intermittent broader. The centerline is indicated only by blackish dots and partly by a very weak line. Very clearly, the black discal spot and a black stain of the costa is at the front end of the outer crossline. Further, most not so sharply defined stains are formed in the apical area of the postdiscal area. Occasionally, the subterminal line at least in the front half of the wing is indicated. A marginal line is usually visible both on the forewings and hindwings. There is a clear line on the hindwings, and a discal fleck. The forewings and hindwings are dusted dark. Therefore, some specimens seem very dark.

Adults are on wing from the end of July to August in one generation.

The larvae feed on lichens, including Usnea barbata. The larvae are bright green with large black dots. It overwinters as a larva.

Subspecies
Alcis jubata jubata
Alcis jubata melanonota (Prout, 1930)

References

External links 

Fauna Europaea
Lepiforum e.V.

Boarmiini
Moths of Europe
Moths described in 1788
Taxa named by Carl Peter Thunberg